Aydın Yelken (3 May 1939 – 16 August 2022) was a Turkish footballer who played as a winger or forward. He made nine appearances for the Turkey national team from 1961 to 1965.

Yelken died on 16 August 2022, at the age of 83.

References

External links 
 

1939 births
2022 deaths
Turkish footballers
Footballers from Istanbul
Association football midfielders
Association football forwards
Turkey international footballers
Turkey B international footballers
Turkey under-21 international footballers
Süper Lig players
TFF First League players
Fatih Karagümrük S.K. footballers
Fenerbahçe S.K. footballers
Altay S.K. footballers
İzmirspor footballers
Samsunspor footballers